Khalaf may refer to:

Khalaf (name)
Al-Khalaf, a village in east-central Yemen
Khalaf, East Azerbaijan, a village in East Azerbaijan Province, Iran
Khalaf, Khuzestan, a village in Khuzestan Province, Iran
Khalaf-e Nabi, a village in Khuzestan Province, Iran
Khalaf, South Khorasan, a village in South Khorasan Province, Iran
Halaf, Iran (disambiguation), various places in Khuzestan Province, Iran